Antal Doráti  (9 April 1906 – 13 November 1988) was a Hungarian-born conductor and composer who became a naturalized American citizen in 1943.

Biography
Antal Doráti was born in Budapest, where his father Alexander Doráti was a violinist with the Budapest Philharmonic Orchestra and his mother Margit Kunwald was a piano teacher.

He studied at the Franz Liszt Academy with Zoltán Kodály and Leó Weiner for composition and Béla Bartók for piano.  His links with Bartók continued for many years: he conducted the world premiere of Bartók's Viola Concerto, as completed by Tibor Serly, with the Minneapolis Symphony Orchestra in 1949, with William Primrose as the soloist.

He made his conducting debut in 1924 with the Budapest Royal Opera.

As well as composing original works, he compiled and arranged pieces by Johann Strauss II for the ballet Graduation Ball (1940), premiered by the Original Ballet Russe in Sydney, Australia, with himself on the conductor's podium. For Ballet Theatre (later renamed American Ballet Theatre) he created scores for the ballets Bluebeard (1941) from music by Jacques Offenbach and The Fair at Sorochinsk (1943) from music by Modest Mussorgsky.

His autobiography, Notes of Seven Decades, was published in 1979. 

In 1983, Doráti was appointed an honorary Knight Commander of the Order of the British Empire (KBE). 

His wife was Ilse von Alpenheim, an Austrian pianist. Doráti died at the age of 82 in Gerzensee, Switzerland.

Career
Doráti held posts as principal conductor of the following orchestras:
 Ballet Russe, Music Director (1937–1941).
 Ballet Theatre orchestra (1941–1945).
 Dallas Symphony Orchestra (1945–1948)
 Minneapolis Symphony Orchestra (1949–1960)
 BBC Symphony Orchestra (1963–1966), which bid him a fond farewell playing his Symphony in Five Movements and his Madrigal Suite.
 Stockholm Philharmonic Orchestra (1966–74), with which he recorded his Symphony No. 1 and his Symphony No. 2, "Querela Pacis" on the BIS label. He took that orchestra on its first international tours.
 National Symphony Orchestra in Washington, D.C. (1970–1977), which he rescued from bankruptcy and a players' strike.
 Detroit Symphony Orchestra (1977–1981)
 Royal Philharmonic Orchestra (1975–1979)

Recordings
He made his first recording with the London Philharmonic Orchestra for the recording label His Master's Voice. This was later transferred to RCA Records with whom HMV were for some time associated. Over the course of his career Doráti made over 600 recordings.

With the Philharmonia Hungarica, Doráti was the second conductor to record the complete symphonies of Joseph Haydn (the first complete recorded edition was conducted by Ernst Märzendorfer and the Vienna Chamber Orchestra, but it had a very limited release). He also recorded an unprecedented cycle of Joseph Haydn's operas and Ottorino Respighi's Ancient Airs and Dances, Suites 1, 2 and 3.

Doráti became especially well known for his recordings of Tchaikovsky's music. He was the first conductor to record all three of Tchaikovsky's ballets – Swan Lake, The Sleeping Beauty and The Nutcracker – complete. The albums were recorded in mono in 1954 and 1955, for Mercury Records released on CD by The Doráti Society, with the Minneapolis Symphony Orchestra (later renamed the Minnesota Orchestra), as part of their famous "Living Presence" series. All three ballets were at first issued separately, but were later re-issued in a 6-LP set. Dorati did re-recordSwan Lake [released on CD by Universal Mercury], but he made a stereo recording of The Sleeping Beauty (complete) with the Concertgebouw Orchestra of Amsterdam for Philips Classics Records, and two complete recordings in stereo of "The Nutcracker", one with the London Symphony Orchestra (again for Mercury), and the other with the Concertgebouw Orchestra for Philips – all this within a span of about twenty-seven years. He also recorded all four of Tchaikovsky's orchestral suites with the New Philharmonia Orchestra, and he was the first conductor to make a recording of Tchaikovsky's "1812" Overture (featuring the Minneapolis Symphony Orchestra) with real cannons, brass band, and church bells, first in mono in 1954 and then in stereo in 1958. Both the mono and stereo "1812" versions sold over one million copies, and awarded a gold disc by the RIAA. He also recorded all six of Tchaikovsky's symphonies with the London Symphony Orchestra.

Other prominent composers in Doráti's recording career were Béla Bartók and Igor Stravinsky. His comprehensive series of Bartók's orchestral works for Mercury have been brought together on a 5-CD set.

He also made the first stereo recording of Léo Delibes' Coppélia, with the Minneapolis Symphony Orchestra. An album set of Wagner's Der fliegende Holländer is also among Doráti's popular recordings.

In 1969 he made the world premiere recording of Sibelius's tone poem Luonnotar, with Gwyneth Jones as soprano soloist.  In 1973 he conducted the world premiere recording of Max Bruch's Concerto for Two Pianos and Orchestra, which was written in 1912 but only rediscovered in 1971.

In 1969 with the Stockholm Philharmonic he conducted the first recording of the Symphony No. 7 of Swedish composer Allan Pettersson.

He made digital recordings, for English Decca Records (released in the U.S. on the London label), with the Detroit Symphony Orchestra and the Royal Philharmonic Orchestra and the Royal Concertgebouw Orchestra for Philips. One of these, the recording of Stravinsky's The Rite of Spring with the Detroit Symphony Orchestra, received the coveted French award Grand Prix du Disque.

See also
 Haydn: La fedeltà premiata (Antal Doráti recording)
 Haydn: Il mondo della luna (Antal Doráti recording)

References

Further reading

External links

Antal Doráti official website

Antal Dorati Centenary Society
Antal Doráti interview, 3 November 1985

1906 births
1988 deaths
Musicians from Budapest
Pupils of Zoltán Kodály
Franz Liszt Academy of Music alumni
Hungarian composers
Hungarian male composers
20th-century composers
20th-century British musicians
Hungarian conductors (music)
20th-century conductors (music)
Male conductors (music)
Ballet conductors
Hungarian expatriates in the United Kingdom
Hungarian expatriates in Switzerland
Hungarian emigrants to the United States
Naturalized citizens of the United States
BBC Symphony Orchestra
Honorary Members of the Royal Academy of Music
Conductors (music) awarded knighthoods
Honorary Knights Commander of the Order of the British Empire
Texas classical music
People of the Royal Stockholm Philharmonic Orchestra
20th-century Swedish male musicians